The Khormans were a local tribe in Wadi Ajal, Fezzan, and were likely of Garamantes descent. In 1300, they established a dynasty with Garma as their capital, after a successful rebellion against the Kanem empire.

Campaign against the Kanem 
In 1320, the Khormans raged a deadly war against the Kanem empire and their vassals in the region.
And defeated them in Battle of Tafnidilt.
This war resorted in brutal losses for the Kanem and the loss of all territory in Fezzan and north-west Aouzou strip.

Conquest of Ghadames 
Some time after their war with Kanem,in 1330 the Khormans led a large campaign against Ghadames.
Some Arab sources suggest Hafsid involvement, but no clear sources suggest that they were able to capture Ghadames.

References

External links
 Fezzan - Encyclopedia
 Fezzan
 Database. Countries. Libya
 Journal article 2020 

Libya
Tribes of Libya
Extinct ethnic groups